Senahú is a town and municipality of the Department of Alta Verapaz in the Republic of Guatemala.

The community of San Antonio Senahú was founded by Q'eqchi' Mayan refugees from a series of 19th-century conflicts in the Ishi Mountains of Central Guatemala. By the mid-1870s, it had become a center of German settlement in Guatemala and a major source of coffee for the European market.

The regions wealth is still formed by big coffee farms and other agriculturist products. In the natural resources it can be found the river of the farm "Trece Aguas", the waterfalls Sereizi and a viewpoint in the general cemetery. Other famous places are the ruins of Chijolom and La Providencia. The crafts elaborated in this region are weaves, ceramics, basketwork, rigs, musical instruments, masks, bed rolls of palm, chandler's shop, objects of "tule" and fireworks.

The approximated extension for this municipality is of 736 km², with a total population of 91,974 (2018 census). Its neighbours are, at the north boundaries Cahabón and Lanquín (Alta Verapaz), south with Panzos and Tucurú, east with El Estor (Izabal), west with Tucurú and San Pedró Carcha (Alta Verapaz). The municipality is formed by 1 town and 41 communities.

Languages spoken
The chief languages are Mayan Q'eqchi' and Spanish.

Important dates
March 13, 1869 – By Governmental Agreement the region was raised to municipality.

Celebrations

June, 8-13 – In Honor of San Antonio. Each year at the end of August, a festival of San Antonio de Padua celebrating native peoples is held here. The festivities include a beauty contest for Q'eqchi' Maya women, the winner of which is crowned with the title "Miss Senahuk".

Franja Transversal del Norte 

The Northern Transversal Strip was officially created during the government of General Carlos Arana Osorio in 1970, by Legislative Decree 60-70, for agricultural development. The decree literally said: "It is of public interest and national emergency, the establishment of Agrarian Development Zones in the area included within the municipalities: San Ana Huista, San Antonio Huista, Nentón, Jacaltenango, San Mateo Ixtatán, and Santa Cruz Barillas in Huehuetenango; Chajul and San Miguel Uspantán in Quiché; Cobán, Chisec, San Pedro Carchá, Lanquín, Senahú, Cahabón and Chahal, in Alta Verapaz and the entire department of Izabal."

Climate

Senahú has a tropical climate (Köppen: Af).

Geographic location

See also

 Franja Transversal del Norte

Notes and references

References

Bibliography

Further reading
Mario E. de la Cruz Torres, Monografía de Senahú. Guatemala: Pineda Ibarra 1978.

External links
 Información completa sobre Senahú

Municipalities of the Alta Verapaz Department